The Billboard Music Award for Top Christian Song winners and nominees.

Winners and nominees

Multiple nominations
Three nominations
Chris Tomlin
MercyMe
TobyMac

Two nominations
Tori Kelly
Building 429
Mandisa
Matthew West
the Newsboys
Zach Williams

References

Billboard awards